Radio Limerick One, also called Limerick 95FM and RLO at times, was the licensed radio station serving Limerick city and county. Licensed by the Independent Radio and Television Commission in 1989, its licence was removed in 1996 for misbehaviour, although the station did not leave the airwaves. It was eventually replaced by Limerick's Live 95FM as the licensed operator.

History
The station started broadcasting in October 1989 from studios in Dooradoyle, Limerick. Its early days were the most memorable as the station had separate radio shows covering about 20 different topics; given Limerick's tradition for a multitude of high-quality pirates covering a wide range of tastes, having a single station to cater for everybody was a task, but one which RLO took to, assisted by the talents of some of those former pirates.

Initially the main presenters at the station were John Ryan, Dr. John Moloney, Declan Copues, Pamela Wilson, Francis Jones and Ger Bradshaw. "Stereo 95 FM, Radio Limerick One" was how one of their main jingles used to go, with the station's catchphrase, "Closer to You", being the main thrust in the promotion of the station to a community that had been starved of local, non-Dublin-focussed radio.

Due to falling ratings the station rebranded itself as Limerick 95FM and moved to 100 O'Connell St. in the centre of Limerick city, around 1992. Changes in ownership occurred through the years as well. During this period, the station became among the first Irish radio stations to transmit via satellite - a service called "Ireland's Overnight Network", allowing other stations to air its generic overnight content in order to operate 24 hours a day without relying on automated playlists.

Irish Satellite Radio
Limerick 95FM also had a sister station for a time called Irish Satellite Radio broadcast via Astra 1B on frequency 11538 V.
The station was on the VH1 TV channel transponder using the analogue transmission system known as Panda. It featured a different schedule, programs and news than the Local variant but at times would simulcast with Limerick 95FM for special events.

The Astra satellite allowed the station to broadcast to Europe and parts of North Africa.
ISR was popular with listeners around the world including ex-pats who enjoyed listening to another Irish radio station, an alternative to RTÉ Radio 1, which incidentally also broadcast from the same transponder.

Both the UK and Germany in particular tuned into Astra 1 transmissions due to their respective countries subscription TV packages emanating from the bird.
Thus Irish satellite radio picked up a large audience from subscribers to the Sky UK service or indeed people who had installed free-to-air satellite equipment.
Several prominent satellite TV listings magazines including Satellite Times and What Satellite TV listed the stations program schedule every month.

Pirate operation
In controversial circumstances which would see court actions continuing into the next century, the station lost its license in 1998. However, it continued broadcasting through its UK legal licence on satellite; this was deflected by unknown community groups back on to the fm band. Its satellite license was removed in 1999 by the Radio Authority in the UK (who had issued it) due to intervention by the then IRTC in Ireland; it was now also broadcasting on the internet worldwide and this source was now deflected again providing a continuous FM broadcast until the Comreg clamp-downs on pirate broadcasting in the early 2000s, and had continued rebroadcasting after many raids.

During the pirate years Radio Limerick One continued to operate as it did when it was a licensed station.
News bulletins were broadcast hourly by the newsroom staff such as Anne O' Grady, Trevor Anderson, Mary Beth Henschel and Aodhan Halligan with night time reports from UK commercial service IRN.
Local obituaries were also read several times a day by the on-air presenter.
RLO also had a dedicated sports team headed up by the then GAA PRO John Ryan and including Keith Fitzpatrick and Dominic Fitzgerald.
Local Gaelic Athletic Association matches were broadcast during season on Sundays using professional outside broadcast equipment where permitted.
The station had a full schedule of programming from 7am-1am.

In the Morning, the breakfast show featured a mix of classic hits, news, weather and travel reports and some chat with presenters such as John Moloney, Frank Carberry, Sean Griffin and Eric Clarke.

This was followed in the afternoon with a lean towards Oldies/M.O.R/Country music often presented by Ger Bradshaw, formerly of Limerick 95fm, Darren Moloney and Fergus Hannan.

Drive-time and evenings featured a 60s/70s/80s music mix over the years including Francis Jones, Fintan Moloney, Ray Fennelly and many others like Enda Caldwell with RLX a Top 40 / Alternative version of RLO and Eric Murphy with Lovesongs.

The night time hours of RLO typically featured chat shows.
The "Late and Live" show was a phone in program made popular by Gerry Hannan.
Uniquely the show had little or no telephone screening process thus meaning most anyone could get on the air.
This led to some controversial incidents over the years and the show was infamous for its "anything goes" approach.

During overnight hours non-stop classic hits were played and in the latter years the "Late and Live" program would be repeated throughout the night.

In 2002, it applied for, was refused, and appealed to no effect a license to operate a medium wave service in the city of Limerick
The license was won by a group chaired by Joe Harrington, a former RLO presenter and ironically never went on air.

During its period as a pirate, much use has been made of the Radio Data System to provide politically loaded messages to users with suitable equipment, ranging from "NO RLO NO VOTE" during a protest at the 2002 Irish General Election to "HELP RLO STOP BCI SLEEZE", a message of such length as to require scrolling. This only provoked more raids and court cases.

By late 2005 the station was under the management of Gerry Hannan who also resumed his late night talk show. The studio was moved to his local book shop.

After a Comreg raid on 13 December 2006, the station never returned. The engineers and 'community groups' are now busy working on other projects. Current owner Gerry Hannan announced he intended to go the legal route of IP broadcasting online. This involved broadcasting by web, anyone with a wireless router and broadband service could buy a WI-FI radio and tune in legally.
However, the service was short lived and RLO has remained off air since.

Notable former presenters from the pirate incarnation of RLO to subsequently work on other radio stations include Francis Jones on Radio Kerry as well as John Moloney and Sean Buckley who are both now on Tipperary Mid west radio and Enda Caldwell now at Pulse 87 in New York. Mary Beth Henschel was Live 95FM's Executive Producer for its talk show Limerick Today for a short time. She then moved on to RTÉ's Lyric FM station in Limerick.
Colm Mcgrath is in Cork and Padraig Gallagher on Newstalk. Fintan Moloney founded a variety of Internet-based stations & now provides mixes for Spin South West FM & presents on Party 934 in the U.S.  Throughout the years some of the Live95fm presenters and staff worked for RLO.

Other programs include comedy legend Tom O'Donnell (Dear Hearts and Gentle People), Fr. Cletus Noone (Noone at Night), Tony Browne (Local History show), Frank Carberry (The Politics Show), Darren Moloney (American and Irish country, Classic Love, Top 40 show), Fergus Hannon (Saturday Sportsbeat), Fintan Moloney (Solid Gold Sunday), Eric Murphy (Pillow Talk) and Sean Buckley (Buckley's People).

RLO TV

Gerard Madden also operated a local TV station under the name RLO TV.
The station was initially broadcast from the Sirius satellite commencing in 1997 and also transmitted in later years via Hot Bird on the frequency 12.597 GHz.

Free satellite equipment was offered to pubs and establishments around the city and county to facilitate reception of Ireland's first digital television channel.

The satellite incarnation of the channel featured a schedule that was looped every few hours with pre-recorded programs presented by several staff from the radio station. The broadcast was uplinked from London, a staff member flew each day with a new tape to play every morning and flew home again.

Programs included the Sean Buckley fronted "Buckleys people" with regular chat style interviews featuring local dignitaries and "Dr. John's Diaries" presented by breakfast show host John Moloney.

Many other programs were featured on the schedule at this time including recorded coverage of Local Gaelic Athletic Association games often unseen on other channels, Irish music video showcases and other general entertainment fare all produced in house at the RLO studios.

After a brief period broadcasting from Hot Bird, satellite transmissions ceased in late 1999.

Upon obtaining several licenses to deflect UK terrestrial TV stations to the county area of the region, the station began broadcasting on UHF Channel 51 from Woodcock Hill to Limerick city. This was linked directly to the main studio and live broadcasting could begin. Gerry Hannan's "Late & Live" radio programme was broadcast live on TV showing the radio studio. Provisions were being sought to set up equipment at prominent 'guests' private houses to broadcast live from, but this never came to light. Live production began on the second floor and the radio was suppressed on one channel to up-link to the hill-sites. There were two other transmission sites at Newcastlewest and Knockfierna intended for reception in the county.

Superimposing background images of limerick on green screens with high end technology began on the Gerry Hannan, Tom O'Donnell and History show. Lighting, sound, vision and transmission were all handled in-house. Staff were trained with high end digital editing suites and high resolution camera's for the time.

At night time Channel 5 was rebroadcast between RLO TV shows. Broadcasts were usually between 22:00 and 01:00 with the frequency reverting to Channel 5 straight after the local broadcast had ended.

During this period, a live element was introduced.
Cameras were set up in the Radio Limerick one studio and joint TV/Radio simulcasts began.
Programs that were featured in this live format included Gerry Hannan Late and Live, The Tom O' Donnell show, The History show and John Ryan's regular GAA special, broadcast both in and out of studio usually titled "Up for the final".

After an ODTR raid in 2001 the radio and TV equipment were seized and the channel never returned.

References

External links

Articles
 Radio authority revokes licence
 Switchboard at radio station jammed
 Radio Limerick one back on air after raid
 Transmitter site owner gets probation

Archived websites
 Defunct former RLO website
 Many archived versions of the RLO website
 Archived RLO radio schedule circa 1999 again from former website
 Archived gallery of some presenters from former website
 Archived gallery of some news and sport on air staff
 Archived RLOTV/C5 Transmission times from January 2001
 Gerard Maddens proposed book
 Rlo95fm info
 Archived Rlo95fm schedule
 Station information page at Radiowaves.fm
 RLO TV Deflector licence

Media
 Clip of RLO TV - Station Promo
 Clip of RLO TV - Tom O' Donnell show
 Clip of RLO TV - Dr John Moloney Diary
 RLO TV Advert Break
 RLO TV Advert Break 2

Defunct radio stations in the Republic of Ireland
Mass media in County Limerick
Pirate radio stations in Ireland
Radio stations established in 1989
Radio stations disestablished in 1996